Aerosur served the following destinations at the time of its collapse:

Central America & the Caribbean 
 Dominican Republic
 Punta Cana - Punta Cana International Airport

Europe 
 Spain
 Madrid - Madrid Barajas Airport

North America 
 United States
 Miami - Miami International Airport
 Washington, D.C. - Washington Dulles International Airport

South America 
 Argentina
 Buenos Aires - Ministro Pistarini International Airport
 Bolivia
 Cobija - Capitan Anibal Arab Airport
 Cochabamba - Jorge Wilstermann International Airport
 La Paz - El Alto International Airport
 Puerto Suárez - Puerto Suárez International Airport
 Santa Cruz de la Sierra
 Viru Viru International Airport Hub
 El Trompillo Airport
 Sucre - Juana Azurduy de Padilla International Airport
 Tarija - Capitán Oriel Lea Plaza Airport
 Brazil
 São Paulo - São Paulo-Guarulhos International Airport
 Paraguay
 Asunción - Silvio Pettirossi International Airport
 Peru
 Cuzco - Alejandro Velasco Astete International Airport

References 
Aerosur website:

Lists of airline destinations